Eudora City Hall is located at 239 South Main Street in Eudora, Arkansas.  The two story Art Deco brick building was built in 1936 as part of a Public Works Administration project, to a design by Little Rock architect A. N. McAninch.  The front facade is faced in yellow brick, while other sides are faced in red brick; the roof is flat, with a parapet running around the top of the building.  The only notable change to its exterior since its construction is the replacement of its wooden front doors with modern plate glass doors.

The building was listed on the National Register of Historic Places in 2006.

See also
National Register of Historic Places listings in Chicot County, Arkansas

References

City and town halls on the National Register of Historic Places in Arkansas
Art Deco architecture in Arkansas
Buildings and structures in Chicot County, Arkansas
City halls in Arkansas
National Register of Historic Places in Chicot County, Arkansas
Eudora, Arkansas